Bobby Barrdjaray Nganjmirra (c. 1915–1992) was a Kunwinjku Aboriginal artist of the Djalama clan and Yirridjdja moiety. He was born around 1915 at Malworn in West Arnhem Land, growing up primarily in a traditional lifestyle despite short periods spent at school in Gunbalanya and on Goulburn Island. He is amongst the best known of the early modern Kunwinjku bark painters and was a contemporary of artists such as Bardayal 'Lofty' Nadjamerrek and Yirawala.

His brothers Jimmy Nakkurridjdjilmi Nganjmirra and Peter Nganjmirra were also well known artists, and their sons and grandsons together form an important artistic dynasty within western Kunwinjku art. Many still paint for Injalak Arts in Gunbalanya. Following his death, Bobby Nganjmirra was known for some time by his skin name Nawakadj, and a large monograph of his work and stories Kunwinjku Spirit: Nawakadj Nganjmirra, Artist and Storyteller was published with this name.

References

External links 

1910s births
1992 deaths
Australian Aboriginal artists
Artists from the Northern Territory
20th-century Australian painters
20th-century Australian male artists
Australian male painters